A list of films produced in Turkey before 1960:

1914–1922 (Ottoman Empire)

1923–1959

References

External links
 Turkish films at the Internet Movie Database

Lists of Turkish films by decade
Lists of 1910s films
Lists of 1920s films
Lists of 1930s films
Lists of 1950s films
Lists of 1940s films
Films
Films
Films
Films
Films
Films